Protva may refer to:
Protva, a river in Moscow and Kaluga Oblasts of Russia; left tributary of the Oka
Protva, a former urban-type settlement in Kaluga Oblast, Russia; since 1996 a part of the town of Zhukov